The 2009 Rally Norway, officially 3rd Rally Norway, is the second round of the 2009 World Rally Championship season and the first round of the Production World Rally Championship and is held between February 12 and February 15, 2009. The rally was held on ice- and snow-covered gravel roads between Oslo and Hamar.

Rally Norway returned to the calendar in 2009 Season after a years absence. This is the Snow Rally of the season. Historically, the Swedish Rally has usually been the rally held on snow in every WRC Season except 1974 and 1990 due to cancellation, 1994 when it was only part of the FIA 2-Litre World Cup for Manufacturers.

Petter Solberg, driving a Citroën Xsara WRC car, won the first stage of the rally. But Sébastien Loeb of France won in a Citroën C4 WRC, his second win on snow since the 2004 Swedish Rally, remaining only non-Scandinavian rally driver ever to win a Snow Rally. Loeb finished ahead of Mikko Hirvonen by +9.8 seconds. Jari Matti Latvala finished third, despite having spun on the last stage on the second running of the Budor. The highest placed Norwegian driver was Henning Solberg in fourth, who was in a tight battle for the position with Dani Sordo. Sordo had held the position for most of the stages until SS14 Mountain 2, where Solberg passed Sordo for fourth place. Both were under pressure from Swede P-G Andersson, on board a privately entered Škoda Fabia WRC, who passed Solberg at SS7 Finnskogen 2. Andersson had to retire at SS12 Ringsaker 1 when he broke his clutch after hitting a snow bank. Solberg finished in sixth in one peace, although he doubted his clutch would last until the end. He was in a tight battle with Matthew Wilson of Great Britain, who finished in seventh place, ahead of Urmo Aava in eighth who collected his first point of the season.

This rally marks the opening Round of the PWRC Season and as the WRC supporting event. Previously, the JWRC was the supporting event in 2007. Swede Patrik Sandell won the class. Eyvind Brynildsen and his co-driver Denis Giraudet, Didier Auriol's former co-driver finished second. Czech Martin Prokop finished in third place ahead of Armindo Araujo. Andis Neiksans of Latvia finished fifth ahead of Jaromir Tarabus in sixth.

Results

Special stages

Championship standings after the event

Drivers' championship

Manufacturers' championship

References

External links 
 Results on the official site: WRC.com
 Results on RallyNorway.com

Norway
2009
Rally